Associazione Sportiva Cittadella, commonly known as Cittadella, is an Italian professional football club based in the city of Cittadella, Veneto, currently playing in .

The team was founded in 1973 and play their home games at the Stadio Pier Cesare Tombolato, which has a capacity of 7,623 seats.

History
Cittadella was founded in 1973, after the merger of U.S. Cittadellense and A.S. Olympia. The club spent most of its first years in amateur football, and then professional football at Serie C2 and Serie C1 ranks. Cittadella won its first promotion to Serie B in 1999 after defeating Brescello in the playoff finals, and spent a total two seasons in the Italian second-highest ranked division, being then relegated in 2001–02 Serie B. During their first stay in Serie B, the club played in Stadio Euganeo in Padua and, in an attempt to expand the fanbase, was renamed A.S. Cittadella Padova, Padua (Padova in Italian) being the home province of Cittadella.

Cittadella returned to Serie B in 2008, after defeating Cremonese in the 2007–08 Serie C1/A playoffs, under the guide of head coach Claudio Foscarini. In the 2008–09 Serie B season, the club was involved to projects focused to boost the capacity of the Stadio Tombolato to 7,500, in order to let the club play in their home town (with dispensation from the FIGC, since a stadium of at least 10,000 seats is required for Serie B). Thus, Cittadella played the first season games in Stadio Omobono Tenni in Treviso, about 40 km away. After some delays, the first Serie B game played in Cittadella was played on 29 October 2008, Ancona being the opponents. The club escaped relegation in the final days of the season, thus ensuring another year of Serie B football to the local fans.

The following season, Cittadella thrashed Lecce 5–1 and Mantova 6–0 to finish 6th, and only losing to Brescia in the playoffs due to Brescia's superior league placing, despite a late 1–0 win in the second leg.

The club produced two strikers who later left for Serie A teams, namely, Riccardo Meggiorini (50% rights sold for €2.5M), Matteo Ardemagni (sold for €3.75M). Moreover, 2010–11 Serie B topscorer Federico Piovaccari also left for Sampdoria in 2011 for €3.5M, although Samp was relegated shortly afterwards from Serie A in 2010–11.

Cittadella was relegated again to Lega Pro in 2014–15.

The club returned to Serie B for the 2016–17 season following their promotion from the Lega Pro and has since regularly competed for the promotion play-off positions, including finishing as high as 5th place in 2019–20. They reached the promotion play-off final to Serie A in 2018–19 against Hellas Verona and, after winning the first match by 2–0 at home, conceded the comeback to Verona in the 2nd leg, losing 3–0 away after going down to 10 men when the score was still 1–0. Similarly, Cittadella also lost in the play-off final against Venezia at the end of the 2020–21 season to again narrowly miss out on the club's first promotion to Serie A.

Players

Current squad

Out on loan

Coaching staff

Notable players
See .

Managers
 Rolando Maran (2002–2005)
 Claudio Foscarini (2005–2015)
 Roberto Venturato (2015–2021)

Honours
 Coppa Italia Dilettanti
 Winners: 1979–80
Lega Pro
 Winners: 2015–16 (group A)

References

External links
Official website

 
Football clubs in Italy
Football clubs in Veneto
Association football clubs established in 1973
Serie B clubs
Serie C clubs
1973 establishments in Italy